These are the official results of the Men's Hammer Throw event at the 1983 World Championships in Helsinki, Finland. There were a total of 33 participating athletes, with the final held on Tuesday August 9, 1983. The qualification mark was set at 73.50 metres.

Medalists

Schedule
All times are Eastern European Time (UTC+2)

Abbreviations
All results shown are in metres

Records

Qualification

Group A

Group B

Final

See also
 1980 Men's Olympic Hammer Throw (Moscow)
 1982 Men's European Championships Hammer Throw (Athens)
 1983 Hammer Throw Year Ranking
 1984 Men's Olympic Hammer Throw (Los Angeles)
 1986 Men's European Championships Hammer Throw (Stuttgart)

References
 Results
 IAAF Results
 hammerthrow.wz

H
Hammer throw at the World Athletics Championships